The 1964 United States House of Representatives election in Wyoming was held on November 3, 1964, to elect the United States representative from Wyoming's at-large congressional district. Incumbent Republican Representative William Henry Harrison III sought reelection to a fifth term, but was defeated by Democratic nominee Teno Roncalio.

Republican nomination

It was speculated that Harrison would run against incumbent Democratic Senator Gale W. McGee in the 1964 Senate election, but on January 29, 1964, he announced that he would not run in the Senate election and run for reelection to the United States House of Representatives instead.

Democratic nomination

Walter Phelan, the chairman of the Wyoming Democratic Central Committee, listed International Joint Commission chairman Teno Roncalio, U.S. Marshall John Terril, Natrona County Attorney Harry Leimback, state Senator Ed Kendig, state Representative Edgar Herschler, Cheyenne Mayor Bill Nation, William Hill, and Ray Whitaker as possible candidates for the Democratic nomination for the United States House of Representatives.

On April 28, 1964, Roncalio announced that he would seek the Democratic nomination for the United States House of Representatives. The Wyoming Democratic Party voted to endorse Roncalio at its state convention on May 9. On July 1, Ronclaio filed to run for the Democratic nomination.

George W. K. Posvar, a perennial candidate, was the first person to file for the Democratic nomination. Hepburn Armstrong, who served as the Democratic nominee during the 1962 election, also filed to run.

Roncalio placed first in the Democratic primary with 29,860 votes (70.26%), with Armstrong receiving 9,371 votes (22.05%), Steve Moyle receiving 2,080 (4.89%), and Posvar receiving 1,188 votes (2.80%).

Results

General election

References

United States House of Representatives elections in Wyoming
Wyoming
United States House of Representatives